Andrey Anatolyevich Makarov (born January 2, 1971) is a Russian-born retired male race walker who competed internationally for Belarus after obtaining citizenship in 1998. He set his personal best (1:18.23) in the men's 20 km event on May 13, 2000 in Soligorsk.

Achievements

References

sports-reference

1971 births
Living people
Russian male racewalkers
Belarusian male racewalkers
Athletes (track and field) at the 2000 Summer Olympics
Olympic athletes of Belarus